The Museo Fundación Rafael Alberti is a museum in El Puerto de Santa María, Spain. It explores the life of the writer and poet Rafael Alberti.

See also
 List of museums in Spain

External links
 http://www.rafaelalberti.es

Museums in Andalusia
Literary museums in Spain
Biographical museums in Spain